MTW may refer to:

Science literature

 Misner, Thorne & Wheeler's book Gravitation on Einstein's general theory of relativity

Media/literature works

 Medieval: Total War, 2001 video game
 Mock the Week, British TV programme which debuted in 2005
 Martin the Warrior, 1993 fantasy novel
 Menschen Technik Wissenschaft (MTW), the preceding show of Einstein on Swiss television SRF

Transport

 MTW, the IATA airport code for Manitowoc County Airport in Manitowoc, Wisconsin
 Maximum taxi weight, or maximum ramp weight, maximum weight for an aircraft being maneuvered on the ground
 Maximum takeoff weight, alternate abbreviation instead of MTOW
 Marinette, Tomahawk and Western Railroad, see List of Wisconsin railroads

Other

 Magahat language (ISO 639 language code: mtw)
 Mission to the World, mission-sending agency for the Presbyterian Church in America
 Machine Tool Wire
 Maoism (Third Worldism), an economic and political philosophy